Sir Joscelyn Ambrose Cramer Coghill, 7th Baronet (30 September 1902 – 6 June 1983) was an Anglo-Irish  actor and aristocrat, being the 7th Baronet of Coghill (1778)  (1981–1983).

He was born in Skibbereen in County Cork in Ireland in 1902, the youngest of three sons of Elizabeth Hildegarde Augusta née Somerville (1867–1954) and the Irish painter Sir Egerton Bushe Coghill, 5th Baronet Coghill (1853–1921). He was the nephew of  Zulu War Victoria Cross recipient Nevill Coghill  and the cousin of the Irish novelist Edith Anna Somerville. Coghill was educated at Haileybury College in Hertfordshire following which he was commissioned as a second lieutenant in the South Wales Borderers (in which his late uncle had famously served in the  Zulu War in 1879) and served with the East African Civil Service. With others he set up a business in Kenya, Colonial Amusements, but the partnership was dissolved in 1935. Coghill served in the Royal Naval Volunteer Reserve during World War II gaining the rank of lieutenant-commander. He acted as an Administration Officer in London for the United Nations (1945–1946) and was Chief Secretary of the Allied Secretariat, Control Commission for Germany (1947–1950) in Berlin in Germany.

His acting roles included: Avarice in the film Doctor Faustus (1967), written and co-directed by his brother Nevill Coghill (1899–1980); Lt. Col. Douglas in the film The Charge of the Light Brigade (1968); Colonel in Whistle and I'll Come to You (1968);  His Father (uncredited) in Oh! What a Lovely War (1969); Cochefer in The Elusive Pimpernel (1969);  Alderman in Canterbury Tales (1969); Colonel in "The Hunting of Lionel Crane" episode of The Wednesday Play (1970); Museum Curator in The Stalls of Barchester (1971), and Daniels in Six Days of Justice (1972).

He married Elizabeth Gwendoline Atkins (1903–1980) on 7 August 1926 with whom he had two children: Faith Patricia Elizabeth Coghill (1928–2016) and Sir Egerton James Nevill Tobias Coghill, 8th Baronet Coghill, (1930–2000). The couple adopted Isabelle Edith Coghill (born 1945). He and his wife divorced in 1949. Secondly, he married Louise Fernande Berdonneau (1927–1978) on 4 July 1949, with whom he had four children: Bridget Olivia Françoise Coghill (born 1949); Christopher Michael Jerome Coghill (1950–1951); Jocelyn Edith Louise Coghill (1952–1983), and Deborah Katherine Hildegrade Coghill (born 1954). On the death of his two elder brothers, including Lieutenant Sir Marmaduke Nevile Patrick Somerville Coghill, the 6th Baronet Coghill (1896–1981) and the academic and writer Nevill Coghill,  he briefly inherited the Coghill baronetcy until his own death in 1983, after which the title passed to his son, Sir Egerton James Nevill Tobias "Toby" Coghill, the 8th Baronet Coghill (1930–2000).

Ambrose Coghill died in 1983 aged 80 in Aberlour in Moray, Scotland.

Filmography

References

External links

Ambrose Coghill, The Peerage Database

1902 births
1983 deaths
People from Skibbereen
20th-century Anglo-Irish people
People educated at Haileybury and Imperial Service College
Younger sons of baronets
Baronets in the Baronetage of Great Britain
People from County Cork
20th-century Irish male actors
Irish male film actors
Irish male stage actors
South Wales Borderers officers
Royal Navy officers of World War II
Royal Naval Volunteer Reserve personnel of World War II